Falsomesosella grisella is a species of beetle in the family Cerambycidae. It was described by White in 1858. It is known from Taiwan.

References

grisella
Beetles described in 1858